The Nokia Lumia 630 is a smartphone developed by Microsoft Mobile that runs Microsoft's Windows Phone 8.1 operating system. It was announced on 2 April 2014, at Microsoft Build 2014 and scheduled to be released in July 2014. It has a Qualcomm Snapdragon 400 SoC with a quad-core processor (MSM8226 or MSM8626) and Adreno 305 GPU. Additionally, it has a 4.5-inch display and a 5 MP camera. The Lumia 635 is similar but 4G-compatible, lacks a dual-SIM version and comes in a different finish, while the Lumia 636 and 638 are identical, but come with 1 GB of RAM (Only 1GB RAM models can upgrade to Windows 10 Mobile) and are currently available only in China and India respectively.

It is the successor of the Nokia Lumia 625, with an improved quad-core processor, but removes the front-facing camera, flash and dedicated camera button. Since the Nokia Lumia 630/635, all of the non-PureView Lumia phones have removed the camera buttons.

On 2 March 2015, Microsoft presented its successor, the Microsoft Lumia 640, with improved 1280x720 HD display, 1 GB of RAM, 8 MP camera with 1080p video recording and LED flash, front-facing camera for selfies and video conference, large 2500 mAh battery, Office 365, Microsoft Outlook and Windows 10 Mobile upgrade ability.

Availability
Nokia launched the Nokia Lumia 630 in India on 12 May 2014, at INR 10,500 along with a dual-SIM variant priced at INR 11,500, both slated to be available from 14 May 2014. In Malaysia it launched at RM549.

In Pakistan the Lumia 630 was announced with Mobilink on 12 May 2014, at the price of 15,990/- PKR

As of 29 May 2014, Nokia announced that the Lumia 630 will be available in the United Kingdom at £89.95 for the single SIM version only. The handset was launched by Carphone Warehouse on 22 May 2014, available for purchase on Pay as you go networks and Pay monthly in green, black, white, yellow and orange.

Nokia also launched the Lumia 630 in the Philippines. It was announced in an event was held at the Bonifacio Global City, Taguig on 13 May 2014, and offered at an affordable price of ₱7,990. It will be available in different colours including bright orange, bright yellow, bright green, white and black.

The Lumia 630 launched in November 2014 for the USA market exclusively for Cricket Wireless. It is available in green and blue and is priced at $100.

The Lumia 630/635 appears to have been discontinued sometime prior to February 2016.

Known issues
The dual-SIM variant of the device has phone call audio loss issues.

The Lumia 635 (AT&T GoPhone Variant) has hardware audio /mic /camera function failure issues after the Lumia Denim or the Windows 10 Mobile over-the-air update.

There is a significant area of dimming along the top of the screen.

Some devices do not allow setting Google as default search.

The Lumia 630 Dual SIM and Lumia 635 get very hot when running for extended periods of time, especially when running Internet Explorer.

Variants
The Nokia Lumia 636 (RM-1027) and 638 (RM-1010) are 1 GB RAM variants of the Lumia 635 that were only sold in China, Hong Kong and the Philippines for specific carriers. The international version of Lumia 638 was released but only sold in India exclusively through the Microsoft Brand Store at Amazon.in since December 2014 and is at present the cheapest 4G smartphone in the country.

Lumia 630 TV Edition (RM-979) is a Lumia 630 Dual SIM variant with a built-in ISDB-Tb receiver which is exclusively sold in Brazil.

Replaceable shell

The smartphone has a changeable shell: bright orange, bright green, bright yellow, matte black, white.

See also 
 Microsoft Lumia

References
  

Windows Phone devices
Microsoft Lumia
Mobile phones introduced in 2014
Discontinued smartphones
Videotelephony
Nokia smartphones
Nokia Lumia 630